Siderolamprus ingridae, Ingrid’s galliwasp, is a species of lizard of the Diploglossidae family. It is found in Mexico.

It was formerly classified in the genus Celestus, but was moved to Siderolamprus in 2021.

References

Siderolamprus
Reptiles described in 2004
Endemic reptiles of Mexico